Bearly Asleep is a 1955 CinemaScope Disney animated short featuring Donald Duck, who appears as a park ranger, with Humphrey the Bear.

Plot
After the park guests leave for the winter, Donald and the bears all wave goodbye, except for Humphrey, who is asleep on a hammock. He and all the bears reside in their cave for their winter hibernation, but Humphrey is being annoyingly loud. After getting a glass of water from Donald's house, he is just about to go inside when Humphrey yells, "OW! Humphrey pinched me!" That angers Donald, as he goes home complaining about all the fuss that Humphrey has given him. Later, Humphrey is kicked out for his loud snoring. After two unsuccessful attempts to sleep in a log where a rabbit sleeps in and a train tunnel where a train thunders out with a steam engine hauling lots of boxcars and a caboose knocking him to the ground, he decides to sleep in Donald's house by pretending to sleepwalk inside and sleep in Donald's bed. Wise to his actions, Donald sets fire to Humphrey's rear end with an oil lamp and tries nailing him out, but Humphrey inadvertently gets back inside when his nose gets stuck on a window. He then tries hiding in the shower, but retreats after being exposed to hot water. He then hides in the kitchen oven, but again gets caught by Donald, who kicks him out for the last time. After having some toys thrown at him, Humphrey disguises himself as a baby to return to the cave, which is a success as one of the bears looks at him and says, "Aw, a baby." and he and the other bears take Humphrey back inside, but to the other bears' disadvantage, as they cannot sleep because of Humphrey's snoring.

Voice cast
 Donald Duck: Clarence Nash
 Humphrey the Bear: Jimmy MacDonald

Home media
The short was released on November 11, 2008, on Walt Disney Treasures: The Chronological Donald, Volume Four: 1951-1961.

References

External links

1955 films
1955 animated films
Donald Duck short films
1950s Disney animated short films
Films directed by Jack Hannah
Films produced by Walt Disney
Animated films about bears
Films scored by Oliver Wallace
CinemaScope films
1950s English-language films
1950s American films
1950s American animated films